Two ships of the United States Navy have been named USS White Plains, after the Battle of White Plains during the American Revolutionary War.

 The first  was an escort carrier in service from 1943 to 1946, and notable for action in the Battle off Samar.
 The second  was a combat stores ship in service from 1968 to 1995.

United States Navy ship names